Maurício de Carvalho Antônio (born 6 February 1992) is a Brazilian professional footballer who plays for Al-Batin in Saudi Arabia as a defender. With Urawa Red Diamonds, he played in the 2017 FIFA Club World Cup where he was the top goalscorer, alongside Romarinho and Cristiano Ronaldo.

Club career
A product of the São Paulo youth academy, Antônio started his career in the lower divisions of Brazilian football. In 2014, he played for Juventus-SP in Paulista A3. In June of the same year, he signed for Portimonense in Segunda Liga.

Antônio made his first team debut against Covilhã. On 1 October 2014, he scored his first goal for the club as Portimonense defeated Porto B 2–0.

On 1 August 2017, Antônio transferred to Urawa Red Diamonds in Japan. On 30 November, he was named in the side's 23-man squad for the 2017 FIFA Club World Cup. He was the tournament's top goalscorer (alongside Romarinho and Cristiano Ronaldo) despite playing only one game and being eliminated in the second round.

Club statistics
Updated to 20 February 2019.

1Includes Suruga Bank Championship, FIFA Club World Cup,and Japanese Super Cup.

Honours

Club
Urawa Red Diamonds
AFC Champions League: 2017

References

External links
Profile at Urawa Red Diamonds
 
 

1992 births
Living people
Association football defenders
Brazilian footballers
Esporte Clube Pelotas players
Clube Atlético Penapolense players
Clube Atlético Juventus players
Portimonense S.C. players
Primeira Liga players
Liga Portugal 2 players
J1 League players
Urawa Red Diamonds players
Saudi Professional League players
Al Batin FC players
Brazilian expatriate footballers
Expatriate footballers in Portugal
Expatriate footballers in Japan
Expatriate footballers in Saudi Arabia
Brazilian expatriate sportspeople in Portugal
Brazilian expatriate sportspeople in Japan
Brazilian expatriate sportspeople in Saudi Arabia
Brazil youth international footballers
Footballers from São Paulo